This is a list of bridges and tunnels on the National Register of Historic Places in the U.S. state of Nebraska.

Many of the bridges were the works of the Nebraska Department of Roads or its predecessors, including the Nebraska Bureau of Roads & Bridges.   Many were registered after a study in the 1990s seeking to inventory historic bridges in Nebraska and pursuant to a Multiple Property Submission titled "Highway Bridges in Nebraska."

See also

 Nebraska Department of Roads
 Western Bridge and Construction Company - Constructed several of the NRHP bridges.

References

 
Nebraska
Bridges
Bridges